Mexia Independent School District is a public school district based in Mexia, Texas (USA).

In addition to Mexia, the district serves the town of Tehuacana. Located in Limestone County, a very small portion of the district extends into Freestone County.

In 2009, the school district was rated "academically acceptable" by the Texas Education Agency.

Schools
Mexia High School (Grades 9-12)
Mexia Junior High (Grades 6-8)
R.Q. Sims Intermediate (Grades 3-5)
A.B. McBay Elementary (Grades PK-2)

References

External links
Mexia ISD

School districts in Limestone County, Texas
School districts in Freestone County, Texas